NHS Wales is the publicly funded healthcare system of Wales. NHS Wales was originally formed as part of the same NHS structure created by the National Health Service Act 1946 but powers over the NHS in Wales came under the Secretary of State for Wales in 1969. In turn, responsibility for NHS Wales was passed to the Welsh Assembly and Executive under devolution in 1999.

See also
 NHS Wales

References

External links
Website of NHS Wales
History of the NHS. 
Maps of all Uk Hospitals and Accommodation

NHS Wales
Welsh Government
NHS Wales